Nolli (minor planet designation: 473 Nolli) is a rather small asteroid that may be in the Eunomia family. It was discovered by Max Wolf on February 13, 1901, but only observed for 1 month so it became a lost asteroid for many decades. It was recovered in 1987, 86 years after its discovery.

References

External links
 
 

Eunomia asteroids
Nolli
Nolli
19010213